The 2019 Swiss Indoors was a men's tennis tournament played on indoor hard courts. It was the 50th edition of the event, and part of the 500 series of the 2019 ATP Tour. It took place at the St. Jakobshalle in Basel, Switzerland, from 21 October through 27 October 2019.

Singles main-draw entrants

Seeds

 Rankings are as of October 14, 2019

Other entrants
The following players received wildcards into the singles main draw:
  Marius Copil
  Alex de Minaur
  Henri Laaksonen

The following player received entry via a special exempt:
  Filip Krajinović

The following players received entry from the qualifying draw:
  Ričardas Berankis
  Hugo Dellien
  Peter Gojowczyk
  Alexei Popyrin

Withdrawals
During the tournament
  Stan Wawrinka

Doubles main-draw entrants

Seeds

 Rankings are as of October 14, 2019

Other entrants
The following pairs received wildcards into the doubles main draw:
  Sandro Ehrat /  Marc-Andrea Hüsler
  Luca Margaroli /  Jan-Lennard Struff

The following pair received entry from the qualifying draw:
  Santiago González /  Aisam-ul-Haq Qureshi

Finals

Singles

 Roger Federer def.  Alex de Minaur, 6–2, 6–2

Doubles

  Jean-Julien Rojer /  Horia Tecău def.  Taylor Fritz /  Reilly Opelka, 7–5, 6–3

References

External links
Official website

2019 ATP Tour
2019
2019 in Swiss tennis
October 2019 sports events in Europe